Willingdon and Jevington is one of the civil parishes in the Wealden District of East Sussex, England. The two villages lie one mile (1.6 km) south of Polegate. Willingdon is part of the built-up area which is Eastbourne, and lies on the main A22 road, whilst Jevington is on a minor road leading to Friston. The civil parish was formed on 1 April 1999 from "Jevington" and "Willingdon" parishes. In addition under the name of Willingdon it is also an electoral ward.

The villages

Willingdon

Willingdon ancient ecclesiastical parish stretched across the entire north of the town of Eastbourne, reaching the English Channel at Langney Point. It included Hampden Park, now also part of the Eastbourne area. See map here: Willingdon was the base for the local village of the same name in George Orwell's Animal Farm. The Red Lion Inn is also a real place in the village.

Willingdon is in fact two villages, (Upper Willingdon and Lower Willingdon).

Jevington
Jevington lies on a minor road between Polegate and Friston. The Jevington parish church is dedicated to St Andrew, and contains Saxon elements (including a tower) as well as many other medieval architectural features, including a 14th-century font. A rare elm cultivar 'Serpentina' grows in the grounds. The parish takes in the hamlet of Filching and also Wannock. 

The village pub is called The Eight Bells. The Hungry Monk restaurant claimed fame as the birthplace of banoffee pie, though it is now closed and has been turned into cottages.

Wannock

Wannock below the South Downs between the villages of Polegate and Jevington. It has a village hall, but no church, pub or shops. It has 300 suburban homes, mainly bungalows housing elderly residents. There were once two tea gardens in Wannock which were popular with coach parties visiting from nearby Eastbourne. A dance hall stood on stilts over the local beauty spot of Wannock Glen. Wannock may be a Saxon place name; according to one source, Wannock supposedly contains the element "Wan" from "Woden" Wannock is mentioned in the Domesday Book (1086) and in an Napoleonic assessment/inventory of the British south coast defences. There is a manor Wannock Place, two medieval cottages and a cottage which was a watermill. One medieval cottage is called "Stream Cottage", the other medieval cottage is owned by Nigel Waterson, former local MP. The area was once known for its walnut groves and some house gardens still contain walnut trees.

Filching

Filching lies at the other end of the Wannock Glen from Wannock along the Polegate to Friston road. It consists of a few houses, Gibby's Tea Gardens, a chalk quarry and a medieval manor house. Filching Manor was built around 1450.

Filching Manor Motor Museum is the home of Blue Bird K3, the last remaining intact Bluebird boat – a Rolls-Royce engined speedboat driven by Sir Malcolm Campbell to take the World Water Speed Record in 1937. This is the only world record boat surviving intact. A long term restoration project is ongoing. The museum also has Bluebird Electric 2 vehicle on display.

Filching Manor is also the site of the annual Jevington Fête, and it houses a public karting track (the Campbell Circuit) in the grounds for arrive-and-drive sessions, and other race events.

Landmarks
The parish contains Folkington Reservoir, a Site of Special Scientific Interest (SSSI), although the village of Folkington lies in the neighbouring Long Man parish. Folkington Reservoir is a covered reservoir built within the chalk of the South Downs. Its surrounding area contains a diverse chalk flora including the protected  hairy mallow Althaea hirsuta.

Other notes
The Polegate Airship Station was in the parish between July 1915 and April 1919.

The Labour cabinet minister George Brown lived in the area and when elevated to the peerage became Lord George-Brown of Jevington.

Willingdon and Jevington is said to be the real-life setting of George Orwell's novel Animal Farm.

References

Civil parishes in East Sussex
Wealden District